{{DISPLAYTITLE:C18H25NO}}
The molecular formula C18H25NO may refer to:

 Aminoestradiol
 Cyclazocine
 Methorphans
 Dextromethorphan
 Levomethorphan
 Racemethorphan
 Nepinalone
 α-PCYP
 2β-Propanoyl-3β-(4-tolyl)-tropane